Otis Massey (May 26, 1891 – September 1968) was mayor of Houston, Texas from January 1943 to 1946. He was married to Mayme Kiser, they had two daughters, Dorothy and Marion. Massey was the first mayor of Houston to serve under the city manager form, rather than the city commission form of government. As mayor, he supported a proposal to sell 133 acres of land to the M.D. Anderson Foundation in December 1943. This land would be developed into hospitals in the Houston Medical District. He proclaimed May 22, 1946 to be National Maritime Day in Houston.

References

1891 births
1968 deaths
Mayors of Houston
20th-century American politicians